The 2015 Campeonato Paraense Final was the final that decided the 2015 Campeonato Paraense, the 103rd season of the Campeonato Paraense. The final were contested between Independente and Remo.

Remo defeated Independente 2–0 to win their 44th Campeonato Paraense title.

Teams

Match

Details

See also
2016 Copa Verde
2016 Copa do Brasil

References

Campeonato Paraense Final